is a Japanese version of flat track motorcycle racing, but combines gambling added into it and is held on an asphalt course, throughout Asia. It is regulated by the JKA Foundation.

Autorace is predominantly a gambling sport. The first ever meeting was held at Funabashi in 1950, but the more traditional speedway and flat track dirt surfaces were banned by the government in the 1960s because they were considered too dangerous. 

Unlike other forms of motorcycle and gambling sport, prior to race day, riders are required to reside at the dormitory with over 500 riders and refrain from contacting anyone within the outside world including any forms of communications to prevent race fixing, which scandalised the sport during the years of the sport when the Yakuza took over the sport and as a result, crowds dwindled and it was saved when a motorcycle federation took it over in 1967. Since then the sport has very much gone its own way to develop into a form of motor sport exclusive to Japan, although in the 1990s, there was non-betting series featuring flat-track motorcycles on established short-track paved ovals (under 1,000m in general) in the United States, the Motorcycle Asphalt Racing Series. 

Auto Race competitions are held on tarmac tracks, and usually involve eight riders and runs for six laps. The hard surface dictates riders lean round the corners rather similar to motorcycle road racing, than slide as in conventional Speedway, the sport from which Autorace was derived. A typical Auto Race bike is 599cc and has a two-speed gearbox. As in Speedway, the bikes have no brakes and are designed with the left handlebar higher than the right in order to help maintain stability while leaning the machine on the banked oval circuit. 

As well as their real names, all the riders have an alias, or nickname, which they go by. All are trained in official training schools and have to pass a qualifying examination before being allowed to become competitive riders. Once qualified, riders are graded according to their results and these grades are used to ascertain racing positions, with the higher graded riders starting from the back grids. Riders are identifiable by number and shirt colour. An average rider usually spends half a year living away from home. Between races, the bike is kept together with other bikes.

Although they are better paid than most of their counterparts, unlike their road racing counterparts, the Auto Race riders do not have celebrity status or product endorsements, and few have raced in road racing unlike its North American counterpart (American Flat Track), which has been the home of numerous championship riders that advanced to MotoAmerica, MotoGP, and World Superbike.  However, one of the well-known riders is the veteran Mitsuo Abe, better known as the father of late MotoGP and World Superbike star Norifumi.

The sport also spawned a manga called Speed Star, written by Shinya Iihashi and serialized in Young King from 2005 to 2007.

See also
Gambling in Japan

References

External links
autorace.jp - Official site
autorace.jp - English Auto Race guide

Motorsport in Japan
Motorcycle speedway